Hussain Sharif (born 1961)  is an Emirati artist based in Dubai, United Arab Emirates. Co-founder of Emirates Fine Arts Society and is one of the original "Five" conceptual artist in the UAE including Mohammed Kazem,  Mohammed Ahmed Ibrahim, Abdullah Al Saadi and his brother Hassan Sharif.

Group exhibitions
 2010  Dropping Lines1, Salwa Zeidan Gallery, Abu Dhabi, U.A.E.
 2010  Arab world meets Zurich1, AB Gallery, Zurich, Switzerland
 2008  Selected UAE contemporary Artist Expo1, Zaragoza, Spain
 2005  Cultural Diversity 1, Sharjah Art Museum, U.A.E.
 2003  6th Sharjah International Art Biennial, Sharjah, U.A.E.
 2002  Dhaka Biennial, Bangladesh
 2002  5 UAE 1, Ludwig Forum for International Art, Aachen, Germany
 1999  4th Sharjah International Art Biennial, Sharjah, U.A.E.
 1998  U.A.E. Contemporary Art, Institute of Arab World, Paris, France
 1998  The 7th Cairo International Biennial, Egypt
 1995   Emirates Arts 1, Sittard Art Center, Sittard, Netherlands
 1989  Exhibition of the Emirates Fine Arts Society the Soviet Union1, Moscow, U.R.S.S. (Russian Federation)
 1983  Black and White 1, Al Ahli Club, Dubai, U.A.E.

Solo exhibitions
 2001 Sharjah International Art Biennial, Sharjah, U.A.E.
 1992 Paintings, Oil and Collage1, Sharjah Cultural Center, Sharjah, U.A.E.
 1981 Caricature, Arabic Cultural Club, Sharjah, U.A.E.

See also 

Emirates Fine Arts Society

Hassan Sharif

References 

Emirati conceptual artists
Emirati male artists